The 2012 FIA WTCC Race of Slovakia was the fourth round of the 2012 World Touring Car Championship season and the maiden running of the FIA WTCC Race of Slovakia. It was held on 29 April 2012 at the Automotodróm Slovakia Ring in Orechová Potôň, Slovakia. The first race was won by Gabriele Tarquini for Lukoil Racing Team and the second race was won by Robert Huff for Chevrolet.

Background
Chevrolet came to Slovakia on the back of winning the first six races of the season, with Yvan Muller leading the championship 24 points ahead of Alain Menu. Pepe Oriola was leading the Yokohama Independents' Trophy.

Gábor Wéber returned with Zengő Motorsport after missing the previous round in Morocco due to cost concerns. Isaac Tutumlu sat out the Race of Slovakia after his Proteam Racing team failed to repair his car in time after damage was sustained in Marrakech. SUNRED Engineering's Andrea Barlesi was unable to continue in the World Touring Car Championship after Marrakech with his budget having run out.

Report

Free practice
Oriola was the quickest driver in the opening practice session on Friday, ahead of the Lukoil SEAT León of Tarquini and the Team Aon Ford Focus of James Nash. The session was briefly red flagged when the engine in Tiago Monteiro's León cut out.

It was Chevrolet's turn to top the times in the second free practice sessions, with Menu topping the times ahead of Yvan Muller. After the session had ended, Tarquini beached his car in the gravel having finished the session tenth fastest.

Qualifying
Norbert Michelisz took his first WTCC pole position to beat the Lukoil Racing Team drivers of Aleksei Dudukalo in second and Tarquini in third. A red flag towards the end of Q1 for Franz Engstler's stranded BMW 320 TC prevented Tom Coronel from progressing into the second session. Nash, who had qualified a career best fourth, failed a ride-height check in post-qualifying scrutineering and was dropped ten places on the grid for both races.

Warm-up
Muller led the Sunday morning warm-up session with Nash second, Huff third and Oriola fourth.

Race one
Michelisz led into the first corner but contact with second placed Tarquini would drop him down the order, and further contact with Muller dropped him down to sixth and earned the Chevrolet driver a drive-through penalty. Oriola had briefly climbed into second place before a puncture and the subsequent trip into the gravel ended his challenge. Tarquini led a Lukoil Racing Team 1-2 finish the chequered flag with Menu third for Chevrolet. Dudukalo was the winning driver in the Yokohama Independents' Trophy.

Race two
Stefano D'Aste started on the reversed grid pole and led down into turn one. The Chevrolet trio and Tarquini took the lead when the Wiechers-Sport driver ran wide. Dudukalo was issued with a drive through penalty for failing to have all four wheels on his car on the ground when the five-minute board was shown before the race. Huff led Muller and Menu until Tarquini took his third place. ROAL Motorsport's Tom Coronel also overtook Menu before the Swiss retired with a broken rim. Huff took his first win of the year ahead of Muller and Tarquini, with Oriola the winner in the Yokohama Independents' Trophy.

Results

Qualifying

Bold denotes Pole position for second race.

 — James Nash received a ten place grid penalty for failing a post-qualifying ride height check.
 — Despite not having classified in qualifying, Tom Boardman was allowed to start at the back of the grid for both races.

Race 1

Bold denotes Fastest lap.

Race 2

Bold denotes Fastest lap.

Standings after the round

Drivers' Championship standings

Yokohama Independents' Trophy standings

Manufacturers' Championship standings

 Note: Only the top five positions are included for both sets of drivers' standings.

References

External links 

Slovakia
Race of Slovakia
FIA WTCC Race of Slovakia